Harry Miller "Doc" Imlay (January 12, 1889 – October 7, 1948) was a Major League Baseball pitcher who appeared in nine games for the Philadelphia Phillies in its 1913 season.

External links

1889 births
1948 deaths
Baseball players from New Jersey
Major League Baseball pitchers
People from Allentown, New Jersey
Philadelphia Phillies players
Sportspeople from Monmouth County, New Jersey